The 1998 Liverpool Victoria Charity Challenge was the fourth edition of the professional invitational snooker tournament, which took place between 26 February and 1 March 1998. The tournament was played at the Assembly Rooms in Derby, and featured twelve professional players.

John Higgins won the title, beating Ronnie O'Sullivan 9–8 in the final.


Main draw

Final

References

Champions Cup (snooker)
1998 in snooker
1998 in English sport
Sport in Derby
1990s in Derby